2020 Pakistan Super League (also known as PSL 5 or for sponsorship reasons as HBL PSL 2020) was the fifth season of the Pakistan Super League, a franchise Twenty20 cricket league which was established by the Pakistan Cricket Board (PCB) in 2015. It started on 20 February 2020. The league was held entirely in Pakistan for the first time. Karachi Kings won their first title after defeating Lahore Qalandars by five wickets in the final.

The playoff stage of the tournament was postponed due to the COVID-19 pandemic. In late March 2020, the PCB were looking at whether to declare the winner of the tournament based on the league standings, or to play the matches at a later date. On 2 July 2020, the PCB announced that they plan to complete the season in November 2020. On 2 September 2020, the PCB confirmed the fixtures for the remaining matches.

Background
In February 2019, the Prime Minister of Pakistan, Imran Khan, announced that the fifth season of the tournament will be held entirely in Pakistan. In March 2019, Ehsan Mani, Chairman of Pakistan Cricket Board also expressed the desire to host all the matches of this season in Pakistan. On 1 January 2020, PCB announced fixtures for the tournament confirming that the entire tournament will take place in Pakistan.

Teams and squads

The players draft took place on 6 December, with the first round taking place on 3 November 2019. Ahead of the draft, each team was allowed to retain up to eight players from their previous squad. On 1 December 2019, PCB announced the retention players list with all six teams retaining a total of 45 players from the previous season.

Ahead of the play-offs, teams included new players in their squad as Faf du Plessis, Khurram Shehzad and Hardus Viljoen replaced Kieron Pollard, Mohammad Amir Khan and Liam Dawson respectively, in Peshawar Zalmi squad. In Multan Sultans squad Mahmudullah and Adam Lyth replaced Moeen Ali and Fabian Allen respectively. Lahore Qalandars replaced Chris Lynn, Salman Butt and Seekkuge Prasanna with Tamim Iqbal, Abid Ali and Agha Salman respectively. While, Karachi Kings replaced Chris Jordan and Ali Khan with Sherfane Rutherford and Waqas Maqsood. On 7 November 2020, Peshawar Zalmi replaced England's Liam Livingstone with his national side teammate Saqib Mahmood after he was included in the national team against South Africa. On 8 November, Multan Sultans's squad members Mahmudullah tested positive for COVID-19 making him unable to take part in the tournament and was replaced by Brendan Taylor, and James Vince was replaced by Joe Denly after he also tested positive for COVID-19. Kings' Mitchell McClenaghan and Zalmi's Daren Sammy were replaced by Wayne Parnell and Sohaib Maqsood respectively. Few days later, Hasan Ali of Peshawar Zalmi was ruled out of the tournament due to back-strain and was replaced by Mohammad Imran, and in Lahore Qalandars squad, Salman Irshad replaced Agha Salman who  suffered an ankle injury.

Venues
The tournament took place entirely in Pakistan. Total 34 matches were played in four venues Lahore,
Karachi, Rawalpindi and Multan. The opening ceremony took place in Karachi. The playoffs were scheduled to take place in Lahore in November 2020, after being postponed for 8 months due to COVID-19 pandemic but were later shifted to Karachi.

Match officials

Umpires

  Faisal Afridi
  Aslam Bareach
  Aleem Dar
  Michael Gough
  Majid Hussain
  Nasir Hussain
  Richard Illingworth
  Imtiaz Iqbal
  Saqib Khan
  Ranmore Martinesz
  Tariq Rasheed
  Ahsan Raza
  Shozab Raza
  Rashid Riaz
  Asif Yaqoob

Referees
  Mohammad Anees
  Muhammad Javed
  Roshan Mahanama
  Aziz-ur-Rehman

Promotion in media
The league was promoted on social media by the hashtag #HBLPSLV and anthem titled #TayyarHain.

Opening ceremony
The opening ceremony was held on 20 February 2020 at National Stadium, Karachi, prior to the first match of the season.

The show began with the national anthem, before a group of drummers and trumpeters performed an instrumental version of the official PSL 2020 anthem. Later, the first performance of the night was a Sufi medley featuring singer Sanam Marvi, qawwals Fareed Ayaz and Abu Mohammad, and the band Soch. This was followed by Sajjad Ali, Aima Baig, Abrar-ul-Haq and Rahat Fateh Ali Khan taking the stage one after another to perform their songs. The ceremony concluded with Ali Azmat, Arif Lohar, Haroon and Asim Azhar performing the PSL 2020 anthem Tayyar Hain, accompanied by a fireworks display in the background.

Cancer awareness
The childhood cancer awareness day and the breast cancer awareness day were observed on 22 February and 7 March respectively, with the stadiums themed as gold and pink respectively.

COVID-19 pandemic impact

The later part of the tournament was affected by COVID-19 pandemic. The matches were reduced from 34 to 33 and the playoffs were replaced by knockouts thus shortening the tournament by 4 days. The final was rescheduled from 22 March to 18 March. The matches from 13 March were announced to take place behind closed doors.

As many as eighteen players were confirmed to not take part in any future matches after the increased cases of COVID-19 in Pakistan as well as in the rest of the world, and also to avoid being stranded from their home countries due to border closures, as was the case for New Zealanders Colin Munro, Luke Ronchi, and Mitchell McClenaghan.

On 17 March 2020, it was announced that the knockout stage is suspended after English cricketer Alex Hales showed symptoms of the virus. Hales observed self-isolation on his return to England, whereas PCB released a statement saying that Hales was not the player suspected of coronavirus and instead refused to reveal the identity of the player suspected of having COVID-19.

League stage

Format
The six teams played 10 matches each and got 2 points for every win, none for a loss and 1 point for a no result. The top four team in the group stage were qualified for the play-offs.

Points table

Summary

League progression

Fixtures
The PCB confirmed the fixtures for the tournament on 1 January 2020.

Playoffs
On 2 September 2020, PCB announced the venue and dates for the remaining four matches, with Gaddafi Stadium hosting all four; matches will be held on 14 and 15, with the Final scheduled on 17 November. However, later the matches were shifted to National Stadium in Karachi due to poor air quality in Lahore.

Qualifier

Eliminators

Eliminator 1

Eliminator 2

Final

Awards and statistics

Most runs

  Babar Azam of Karachi Kings received the Green Cap.

Most wickets

  Shaheen Afridi of Lahore Qalandars received the Maroon Cap.

Notes

References

External links
 
 Series home at ESPNcricinfo

 
2020 in Pakistani cricket
February 2020 sports events in Pakistan
March 2020 sports events in Pakistan
COVID-19 pandemic in Pakistan
Cricket events postponed due to the COVID-19 pandemic
Pakistan Super League